Terence O'Brien (1887–1970) was an Irish-born British stage actor, active at Stratford, The Old Vic and in the West End.  He also appeared in several films.

Selected filmography
 The Merchant of Venice (1916)
 The House Opposite (1917)
 Q Ships (1928)
 Midnight Menace (1937)
 The World Owes Me a Living (1945)

References

External links
 

1887 births
1970 deaths
British male stage actors
British male film actors
Male actors from Dublin (city)
20th-century British male actors